Akeneo is a technology company that develops product information management (PIM) and product data intelligence software to improve customer experience. The company was founded in 2013 by Frédéric de Gombert, Benoit Jacquemont, Nicolas Dupont and Yoav Kutner. Akeneo is headquartered in Nantes, France and has offices in the United States, United Kingdom, Germany, Spain, Italy, Israel and Australia with more than 400 employees. It has worked with customers including Shop.com, Fossil, Midland Scientific, Air Liquide, Rexel, Babolat, LVMH and Auchan.

History
Before founding Akeneo, Frédéric de Gombert, Benoit Jacquemont and Nicolas Dupont had worked together at the open source company, Smile. They began developing a single product database to compete with Excel and brought Yoav Kutner onboard in founding Akeneo. The name comes from the Greek word akene, like the achenes' fruits that contains all the fruits' information and spread them along the winds. The company started producing a system for managing product information for use across distribution channels. Available under the open source license 3.0, the first public beta of Akeneo PIM was released in September 2013.

In January 2016, the company's chief executive officer, Frédéric de Gombert, received the prize Young Entrepreneur Prize in Digital from the French newspaper, La Tribune. Akeneo was a co-founder and partner of the Open Source School created by Smile and the École privée des sciences informatiques. The company also opened offices in Düsseldorf, Germany and Boston, Massachusetts during early 2016.

The Deloitte Technology Fast 500 named Akeneo on its EMEA list for 2017. Akeneo expanded into Israel after acquiring Sigmento, product data automation startup company. The acquisition worked to merge Sigmento's technology with Akeneo's products for data enrichment automation. The company also opened offices in Spain, Poland and the United Kingdom during early 2018. By late 2018, Akeneo had partnered with Magento to integrate its PIM software with the e-commerce system.

In March 2019, the company expanded into Italy and later announced that it would be opening an office in Australia in 2020. Akeneo was recognized as a leader in product information management applications on an IDC Marketscape report in late 2019.

Funding 
Before beginning official funding, KIMA Venture and Nestadio Capital contributed €350,000 to the company in 2013. In September 2014, Akeneo received initial funding of $2.3 million led by Alven Capital. The company raised a Series B funding round of $13 million led by Partech Ventures in March 2017. Salesforce Ventures made a strategic investment in the company as it continued to expand in North America. It completed a $46 million Series C funding round in September 2019 led by Summit Partners.

Finally, a last $135 million Serie D funding was completed in March 2022, always led by Summit Partners.

Products 
Akeneo's products include two versions of its open-source PIM software: a free community edition (CE) as well as an enterprise software as a service (SaaS) edition (EE). More than 70,000 companies use the free community edition (CE) version. Akeneo PIM open source software is built under license OSL 3.0 and written in PHP. In addition, the company launched additional modules for onboarding product information from suppliers, the Akeneo Onboarder, content syndication and AI-based curation of product content capabilities.

In February 2020, the company released PIM 4.0 that included features such an asset manager, data quality insights, product attribute mapping and connection management by using API-based integration. Akeneo PIM is featured in the leader quadrant on the G2 PIM vendor grid.

Versions 
Note that the names of CE releases are based on Bugs Bunny episodes, and EE releases on vegetals that have akenes.

References

External links 
 Official website

Free content management systems
Software companies of France
Software using the Open Software License